Joshua Ogunlola (born 19 April 1987) is a Nigerian cricketer. He played in the 2014 ICC World Cricket League Division Five tournament.

References

External links
 

1987 births
Living people
Nigerian cricketers
Place of birth missing (living people)
Yoruba sportspeople